Ellis Ferreira and Rick Leach were the defending champions, but lost in second round to Simon Aspelin and Jaime Oncins

Martin Damm and Dominik Hrbatý won the title by defeating Wayne Ferreira and Yevgeny Kafelnikov 6–4, 3–6, 6–4 in the final. It was the 17th title for Damm and the 1st title for Hrbatý in their respective doubles careers.

Seeds

Draw

Finals

Top half

Bottom half

References
 Main Draw

Italian Open - Doubles, 2000
Men's Doubles